The following is a timeline of the history of the city of Marrakesh, Morocco.

Prior to 20th century

 1070 CE - Marrakesh founded by Abu Bakr ibn Umar (or in 1062 according to some sources)
 1117 - Almoravid Koubba built.
 1126 - Ramparts built (approximate date).
 1127 - Bab Agnaou (gate) built.
 1129 - City besieged by Almohads.
 1132 - Masjid al-Siqaya (mosque) built (approximate date).
 1147 - Almohads in power.
 1157 - Agdal Gardens laid out.
 1158 - Kutubiyya Mosque re-built.
 1182 - Scholar Al-Suhayli arrives in Marrakesh (approximate date).
 1190 - Kasbah Mosque completed.
 1197 - New qasba built.
 1248 - Marinids in power.
 1288 - Abu Yaqub in power.
 1331 - Sidi Muhammad ibn Salih mosque built.
 1350 - Traveler Ibn Battuta visits city.
 1525 - Saadians in power.
 1554 - Mohammed ash-Sheikh in power.
 1557 - Sidi’l-Jazuli hospice built.
 1565 - Ben Youssef Madrasa built.
 1572 - al-Muwassin mosque built.
 1593 - El Badi Palace built.
 1603 - Saadian Tombs built.
 1606 - City taken by forces of Abd Allah.
 1664 - 31 July: City taken by forces of Alaouite Al-Rashid of Morocco.
 1746 - Mohammed ben Abdallah in power.
 1900 - Bahia Palace built.

20th century

 1906 - Population: 50,000 to 60,000. (estimate). 
 1907 - Émile Mauchamp a French doctor, assassinated by a mob.
 1912
 Mauritanian Ahmed al-Hiba in power.
 6 September: Battle of Sidi Bou Othman occurs near city.
 September: City occupied by French forces.
 Fort built.
 1919 -  area planned.
 1923
 Marrakesh railway station built.
 La Mamounia hotel in business.
 Public library opens.
 1926 - Population: 149,263.
 1932 - Dar Si Said (museum) opens.
 1943 - Tower of the Koutoubia Mosque painted by Winston Churchill
 1947
 Majorelle Garden opens.
 Kawkab Marrakech football club formed.
 1948 - Mouloudia de Marrakech football club formed.
 1951 - Population: 215,312.
 1973 - Population: 330,400 city; 436,300 urban agglomeration.
 1978 - Cadi Ayyad University established.
 1985 - Medina of Marrakesh UNESCO World Heritage Site established.
 1987
 Marrakech Marathon begins.
 École supérieure de commerce de Marrakech (school) established.
 1994
 August: Hotel shooting.
 Population: 745,541.
 1996 -  (museum) opens.
 2000 - École nationale des sciences appliquées de Marrakech established.

21st century

 2004 - Population: 823,000.
 2005 - Marrakech Biennale begins.
 2009 - Fatima-Zahra Mansouri becomes mayor.
 2011
 28 April: 2011 Marrakesh bombing at Jemaa el-Fnaa.
 Stade de Marrakech (stadium) opens.
 TEDx Marrakesh begins.
 Population: 939,000.
 2014
 August: 2014 African Championships in Athletics held in city.
 Population: 978,045 (estimate).
 2015 - City becomes part of the Marrakesh-Safi administrative region.
 2016 - November: 2016 United Nations Climate Change Conference (COP22) held in city.

See also
 History of Marrakesh
 Imperial cities of Morocco
 Timelines of other cities in Morocco: Casablanca, Fez, Meknes, Rabat, Tangier
 History of Morocco

References

This article incorporates information from the French Wikipedia and German Wikipedia.

Bibliography

in English
 
  (written in 16th century)
 (includes Marrakesh)

in French
 
  (+ table of contents)

External links

 

Marrakesh
Marrakesh